Desmocyon is an extinct genus of the Borophaginae subfamily of canids native to North America. It is a rarely found genus, with fossil deposits only occurring in western Nebraska, Wyoming, New Mexico and north Florida. It is regarded as a primitive, transitional member of the Borophagini tribe.

References

zipcodezoo.com
The Biology and Conservation of Wild Canids by David W. Macdonald and Claudio Sillero-Zubiri; page 42 

Borophagines
Miocene canids
Pliocene extinctions
Prehistoric carnivorans of North America
Prehistoric carnivoran genera